Mohamoud Diriye Abdi Joof is a Somali politician who served as the minister of social services for Khatumo State from 2012 to 2016.

See also
Politics of Somalia

References

Somalian politicians
Living people
Year of birth missing (living people)